Vuckanivska (Russian: Вулка́новка, Ukrainian: Вулканівка, Crimean Tatar: Cav Töbe)  is a village in the district of Lenine Raion in Crimea.

Geography 
Vulkanivska is located in the south of the district and the Kerch Peninsula, to the west of Uzunlarske Lake, and east of Yarke.

References 

Villages in Crimea